The BBC Sports Personality of the Year 2020 took place on 20 December 2020 at the dock10 studios in Salford.

The event was broadcast live on BBC One and hosted by Gary Lineker, Clare Balding, Gabby Logan and Alex Scott.

Nominees
The nominees for the award were revealed on 1 December 2020. On the night of the final, the public were allowed to vote for one of only six pre-selected contenders.

Controversy
This year’s Award was cornered by controversy, when the WBC World Heavyweight Champion, Tyson Fury, issued a video on social media politely requesting the BBC remove his name from the nominations for the award: ‘This is a message for the @bbcsport and their SPOTY award. Please take me off your list as I'm the people's champion and have no need for verifications or any awards.’ The BBC ignored Fury’s request. Fury then had his lawyers send the BBC an official letter repeating his request. The BBC did not remove Fury’s name from the nominations. Fury requested his fans to respect his wishes and not to vote for him.

Other awards
In addition to the main award as "Sports Personality of the Year", several other awards were also announced:

Team of the Year: Liverpool F.C.
Coach of the Year: Jürgen Klopp
World Sport Star: Khabib Nurmagomedov
Young Sports Personality of the Year: Andrea Spendolini-Sirieix
Unsung Hero: Sgt Matt Ratana
Helen Rollason Award: Captain Sir Tom Moore
Captain Tom Young Unsung Hero: Tobias Weller
Expert Special Panel Award: Marcus Rashford

Performers

In Memoriam
The following people were remembered at the ceremony:

Stirling Moss
Norman Hunter 
Trevor Cherry
Willie Thorne
David Bryant 
Alan Glazier
Helen Grandon
Mickey Wright 
Liz Edgar
Jackie Brown
Barney Eastwood 
Alan Minter
Peter Bonetti
Harry Gregg 
Tony Dunne
Everton Weekes
David Capel 
Dean Jones
Liam Treadwell
Pat Smullen 
Stan Mellor
Lucy Kerr
Bobby Brown 
Marius Zaliukas
Steve Lee
Steve Preston 
Mike Renshall
Helen Yate
Alex Olmedo 
Angela Buxton
Mike Slemen
Matthew Watkins 
Ray Prosser
Paolo Rossi
Papa Bouba Diop 
Peter Whittingham
Jordan Cox
Frank Myler 
Basil Watts
Frank Bough
David Mercer 
Peter Walker
Kobe Bryant
Margaret Maughan
Eric Hall
Radomir Antic 
Maurice Setters
Denise Smith
Tony Rutter 
Joy Rainey
Neil Black
Ged Stokes 
Nicolas Portal
Christophe Dominici
Raymond Hunter 
Iain Laughland
Gerard Houllier
Ray Clemence 
Michael Robinson
J. J. Williams
Peter Alliss
Malcolm Yardley

References

External links
Official website

BBC Sports Personality of the Year awards
BBC Sports Personality of the Year Award
Bbc
BBC Sports Personality of the Year Award
BBC Sports Personality of the Year Award
BBC